Vicus Pacati was an ancient city and former episcopal see in Roman North Africa, which only remains as a Latin Church titular see of the Catholic Church.

History 
The name refers to the vicus (area, quarter, district) constituting the latifundia of the family Arii Pacati. 

It was among the many cities of sufficient importance to become a suffragan diocese in the Roman province of Numidia, but faded so completely that its location is not even identified for sure with modern Aïn-Mechara in Algeria.

Two of its bishops are historically documented :
 Flavianus, participant at the Council of Carthage called in 484 by king Huneric of the Vandal Kingdom and afterward exiled like most Catholic bishops, unlike their schismatic Donatist (heretic) counterparts
 Florentianus, attended the Council of Carthage in 525.

Titular see 
The diocese was nominally restored in 1933 as Latin titular see of Vicus Pacati (Latin) / Vico di Pacato (Curiate Italian) / Pacaten(sis) (Latin adjective)

It has had the following incumbents:
 Bishop-elect Tomás Balduino, Dominican Order (O.P.) (1967.08.15 – 1967.11.10) as Coadjutor Bishop-Prelate of Territorial Prelature of Santíssima Conceição do Araguaia (Brazil) (1967.08.15 – 1967.11.10); later Bishop of Goiás (Brazil) (1967.11.10 – retired 1998.12.02), died 2014
 Johannes Joachim Degenhardt (1968.03.12 – 1974.04.04) as Auxiliary Bishop of Archdiocese of Paderborn (Germany) (1968.03.12 – 1974.04.04); later succeeded as Metropolitan Archbishop of Paderborn (1974.04.04 – death 2002.07.25), created Cardinal-Priest of S. Liborio (2001.02.21 [2001.10.14] – 2002.07.25)
 Adolfo Hernández Hurtado (1974.12.12 – death 2004.10.15) as Auxiliary Bishop of Archdiocese of Guadalajara (Mexico) (1974.12.12 – retired 1997.03.20) and on emeritate; previously Bishop of Tapachula (Mexico) (1958.01.13 – 1970.09.06), Bishop of Zamora (Mexico) (1970.09.06 – 1974.12.12)
 Paul Hwang Cheol-soo (황철수 바오로) (2006.01.17 – 2007.11.21) as Auxiliary Bishop of Diocese of Busan 부산 (South Korea) (2006.01.17 – 2007.11.21); next succeeded as Bishop of Busan 부산 (2007.11.21 – ...)
 Ariel Edgardo Torrado Mosconi (2008.11.22 – 2015.05.12) as Auxiliary Bishop of Diocese of Santiago del Estero (Argentina) (2008.11.22 – 2015.05.12); next Coadjutor Bishop of Nueve de Julio (Argentina) (2015.05.12 – 2015.12.01), succeeding as Bishop of Nueve de Julio (2015.12.01 – ...)
 Alain Faubert (2016.04.19 – ...), Auxiliary Bishop of Archdiocese of Montreal (Canada) (2016.04.19 – ...).

See also 
 List of Catholic dioceses in Algeria

Sources and external links 
 GCatholic
 Bibliography 
 Pius Bonifacius Gams, Series episcoporum Ecclesiae Catholicae, Leipzig 1931, p. 469
 Stefano Antonio Morcelli, Africa christiana, Volume I, Brescia 1816, p. 353
 H. Jaubert, Anciens évêchés et ruines chrétiennes de la Numidie et de la Sitifienne, in Recueil des Notices et Mémoires de la Société archéologique de Constantine'', vol. 46, 1913, pp. 101–102

Catholic titular sees in Africa
Former Roman Catholic dioceses in Africa
Suppressed Roman Catholic dioceses